Baoshan is a given name. Notable people with the name include:

Deng Baoshan (1894–1968), Chinese politician
Li Baoshan (born 1955), Chinese politician
Wang Baoshan (born 1963), Chinese soccer manager and player

Chinese given names